

Details

Tehran (16)

Razavi Khorasan (6)

Khuzestan (6)

East Azerbaijan (5)

Isfahan (5)

Fars (5)

Provinces with 4 seats and less

Notes

References 

Election results in Iran